Evangeline Smith Adams (February 8, 1868 – November 10, 1932) was an American astrologer based in New York City.  She ran a thriving astrological consulting business, gained widespread notability for successfully defending her astrological practice in court, and wrote a number of popular books about astrology, including Astrology: Your Place in the Sun (1927), Astrology: Your Place Among the Stars (1930), and her autobiography, The Bowl of Heaven (1926). While Aleister Crowley ghostwrote her books on astrology, Adams is an acknowledged contributor to Crowley's own astrological text The General Practice of Astrology.  She has been described as "America's first astrological superstar".

Biography
Adams was born on 8 February 1868 in Jersey City, New Jersey, to a conservative family. Her father died when she was 15 months old.  Before Adams began working as an astrologer full-time, she became engaged to a Mr. Lord, who was believed to be her employer.  Although she said that she was initially in love with him, she lost any feelings that she had for him and subsequently broke the engagement.

She was the companion of Emma Viola Sheridan Fry (educator, journalist, playwright, suffragist) from the late 1920s to the early 1930s. Thousands of subscribers to her astrological newsletter followed her advice to invest in stocks during the run-up to the Stock Market Crash of 1929. Evangeline Adams died in 1932.

Astrological practice and controversies
It was towards the end of her career that Adams took to publishing books and raising her profile within popular media.  For most of her working life, she ran a thriving astrological practice based on consultation by person or mail. This grew to employ several assistants and stenographers. For a number of years Adams employed Crowley as a ghost-writer. Their business relationship eventually turned into an acrimonious one, which brought copyright issues of "who really wrote what", with regards to Crowley's General Principles of Astrology (now settled with the book being attributed to Crowley but with a recognized contribution by Adams).
 
Adams was arrested three times in New York City for fortune telling, in 1911, 1914 and 1923. Although practicing astrology was not legal at that time, all the cases brought against her were unsuccessful and the May 1914 trial brought particular notability due to the judge's acquittal "of all wrong doing" and praise of her skill, after she gave him an astrology reading describing the character of his son from his birth data.

Adams was well paid by her clients for her predictions. She was said to successfully predict changes in the stock market. However, author Carol Krismann noted that:

Skeptics point out that Adams had no knowledge of economics and that her predictions were always fuzzy, foretelling disaster but not specific disasters, and telling that the market would go up when in fact the country was in a period of remarkable growth in the stock market. People who believed often forgot the erroneous predictions and used the ones that happened to come true to "prove" that she was accurate. Adams' most infamous failed prediction was that the "stocks might climb to heaven" a few weeks before the 1929 crash. Investment analyst Kenneth Fisher has written that her few successful predictions were publicized whilst her misses were ignored by those desperate to believe. He described Adams as an "obvious quack with no real investment knowledge."

Notes

References

External links
 , from the TV series 'Secrets in the Stars' (1999) narrated by Leonard Nimoy.

1868 births
1932 deaths
American astrologers
American astrological writers
19th-century astrologers
20th-century astrologers
20th-century American women writers
20th-century American non-fiction writers
19th-century American women writers
19th-century American writers
American women non-fiction writers